Nu Sigma Beta Fraternity is a Puerto Rican fraternity. It was established in 1937 at the University of Puerto Rico by students from diverse backgrounds.

History 
Among the founding members were: Carlos M. Vidal, Jafet Ramirez Ledesma, Jose Antonio Luiña, Jose Enrique Del Valle, Juan Pedrosa, Luis A. Berrios, Pedro Urbiztondo, Pedro A. Mattei, Ruben Gaztambide Arrillaga, Baltasar Quinones Elias, Edwin Cortes Garcia, among others.

These members came together on the Rio Piedras Campus and decided to form their social fraternity based on the principles of appreciation, respect, and tolerance, among other qualities. Believing this, they established a non-profit organization to develop helpful community-oriented citizens, promoting sincere friendship and a sense of brotherhood. Nu Sigma Beta was established with a written constitution.

Shortly after it was established, they celebrated their first initiation ceremony. During this ceremony, seven students joined them. The fraternity quickly expanded and grew in numbers. By 1939, the fraternity opened its second chapter at the UPR-Mayaguez, formerly known as CAAM. This chapter became known as the Beta chapter and the San Juan chapter became the Alpha chapter. The fraternity has continually grown and expanded to encompass almost all institutions of higher learning within Puerto Rico and some beyond. Today, more than 70 years after its founding, there have been and/or are chapters in the Dominican Republic and the United States. Recently the fraternity organized the reopening of the Nu chapter at the Universidad Central del Este at San Pedro de Macorís There are also chapters in the University of Puerto Rico at Humacao and at the Pontifical Catholic University of Puerto Rico.

The fraternity's need to be organized at a central level, due to its expanding nature, led it to be divided into Zones and chapters. Those still in college are inducted into chapters, while those who are not in college are inducted into zones. Chapter members are transferred into zones upon completing their undergraduate and/or postgraduate studies.

Governance 
The fraternity is governed by a presiding or executive committee, composed primarily of the President, First Vice-President, Second Vice-President, General Secretary, and General Treasurer. It also has a separate body acting as the legislative and judicial branches, simultaneously. The Supreme Council is presided over by the Executive Secretary. The governing bodies can only take action based on the rules of the fraternity, but the executive decision relies on the General Assembly, which is composed of zone and chapter delegates. The Constitution may only be amended in General Assembly.

Philanthropy 
The fraternity is dedicated to the creation of outstanding citizens in their community. As a result, the fraternity has many community-based programs, such as drug prevention campaigns, charity sports tournaments, and blood drives for local hospitals and the American Red Cross. Members are active in their communities,  participating in environmental campaigns like SCUBA Dogs. Nu Sigma Beta also holds an annual golf tournament benefiting  Instituto Santa Ana y el Colegio Caliope and her organizations such as Ronald McDonald House, Hogar Niñito Jesus, United Way, and The Salvation Army.

Chapters

Collegiate chapters 
These are the collegiate chapters of the Nu Sigma Beta fraternity.

Notes

Alumni chapters 
These are the Zones or alumni chapters of the Nu Sigma Beta fraternity.

Notable members

 Helcías Bermudez Colom – president of NBM Corp.
 Rubén Berríos – three-time senator, lawyer, and president of the Puerto Rican Independence Party
 Luis Alfredo Colon Velanuez –  senator 1944 to 1968, municipal judge of Lares 1943 to 1944
 Rafael Cordero Santiago – mayor of Ponce 1989 to 2004
 José Esteves – journalist with Telemundo Canal 2 
 Pedro Ruben Gaztambide Arrillaga – former mayor of Río Piedras and member of the Constitutional Convention of Puerto Rico
 Efraín Rivera Pérez – former member of the Supreme Court of Puerto Rico

See also
List of social fraternities and sororities

References

Fraternities and sororities in Puerto Rico
Concilio Interfraternitario Puertorriqueño de la Florida
Latino fraternities and sororities
Student organizations established in 1937
1937 establishments in Puerto Rico